Dusky is an English electronic music duo from London consisting of Alfie Granger-Howell and Nick Harriman. Formed in 2011, they have released music on various records labels, before setting up their own label 17 Steps in July 2014 with the release of the Love Taking Over EP.

Before the formation of Dusky, the duo made music under the name of Solarity.

Recognition 
The duo were voted as DJ Magazine Best British Producers in 2013.

Their debut album Stick By This was named by Pete Tong as "one of the albums of the year" in 2011 and picked up BBC Radio 1 play from Rob Da Bank, Toddla T, Zane Lowe and Pete Tong himself.

Dusky’s track "Careless" reached No.1 on the Beatport Top 100 Chart, remaining at the top spot for over 2 weeks. The track was part of the four track Careless EP, which was released on Will Saul's Aus Music label and followed their previous Beatport top 10 success "Nobody Else" on the label.

Dusky's track "Ingrid Is a Hybrid" is included on the Forza Horizon 3 soundtrack.

17 Steps label 
In 2014, Dusky released their Love Taking Over EP, the first on their 17 Steps label. The track was debuted by a Special Delivery on Annie Mac's BBC Radio 1 show and picked up further support across the station from Pete Tong, Danny Howard, MistaJam, B. Traits and Rob Da Bank among others.

Live performances 
Standout live sets include performances at UK clubs XOYO  and Fabric, hosting a Dusky Presents at Fabriclive in March 2014, as well as their residency at Ibiza's We Love...Sundays at Space.

They have also played festival sets including Glastonbury Festival in the UK, Belgium's Pukkelpop, Serbia's Exit Festival and Germany's Melt!, as well as North American festivals Electric Daisy Carnival, Electric Forest, Movement Electronic Music Festival, and Ultra Festival.

Discography

Studio albums

Extended plays

Singles

References

External links
 

British electronic music groups
English electronic music groups
English house music groups
English house musicians
English DJs
DJs from London
Deep house musicians